It's a Mystery is a networked Children's ITV programme which ran for five series from 12 September 1996 to 9 May 2002. It was produced by The Media Merchants Television Company Ltd for Meridian Broadcasting Ltd. In Series five, the show was retitled as Mystery and featured different presenters. It was a magazine show featuring unusual stories including about UFOs, ghosts and other difficult to explain happenings, some of which were solved while others remained unexplained.

It had three presenters for the first four series the best known was probably Neil Buchanan who presented regular arts show Art Attack between 1990 and 2007, Sophie Aldred did the first series only and Gail Porter (1997–1999) from magazine show How 2 along with Tristan Bancks, they were replaced in 2000 by Ben Jones and Shelley Blond. Steve Wilson and Shiarra Juthan presented the 2002 last series

Format
It was a programme that educated children by challenging them to solve a mystery. Usually this would involve people telling stories of mysterious occurrences that have happened to them, such as a Man in a Van driving up to a roundabout and seeing his exact duplicate across the roundabout, driving the same vehicle. Other times, the presenter would show unexplained phenomena such as ghosts in the Tower of London or the Loch Ness Monster. The presenter would then offer up possible explanations as to what might have been behind the mystery or if there is even an explanation to give. After each story, it would be given a solved or unsolved designation. At the end of each episode, a riddle would be asked for the audience to solve until the next episode (where the answer would be given).

Forty-four episodes were made, and the series regularly made the Children's Top Ten.

Presenters
The programme was originally presented by Neil Buchanan and Sophie Aldred (Series One); Neil Buchanan, Gail Porter, and Tristan Bancks (Series Two and Three); Neil Buchanan, Ben Jones and Shelley Blond (Series Four); Steve Wilson and Shiarra Juthan (Series Five).

The series used many actors over the years. These included; Jo-Anne Good (Crossroads, BBC London 94.9), Russell Hookey (Channel Report, Lookaround, ITV News Anglia, ITN News), Barry Rose (Crossroads), Mike Dyer-Ball (Casualty), and Hal Dyer (Rentaghost, On the Buses, George and Mildred).

Transmission guide

Series 1: 10 editions from 12 September 1996 – 13 November 1996
Series 2: 7 editions from 3 September 1997 – 15 October 1997
Series 3: 10 editions from 4 January 1999 – 8 March 1999
Series 4: 7 editions from 3 April 2000 – 5 June 2000
Series 5: 10 editions from 9 April 2002 – 9 May 2002

References

External links
 

1996 British television series debuts
2002 British television series endings
1990s British children's television series
2000s British children's television series
ITV children's television shows
English-language television shows
Television shows produced by Meridian Broadcasting
Television series by ITV Studios
Television series by Mattel Creations
1990s British mystery television series
2000s British mystery television series